Kajetan Duszyński (born 12 May 1995) is a Polish sprinter specialising in the 400 metres. He represented his country in the 4 × 400 metres relay at the 2017 World Championships reaching the final, as well in the mixed 4 x 400 metres relay at the 2020 Summer Olympics where Poland won gold medal.

International competitions

Personal bests

Outdoor
200 metres – 22.02 (-0.3 m/s, Łódź 2017)
400 metres – 44.92 (Bern 2021)
Indoor
400 metres – 47.84 (Spała 2016)

References

1995 births
Living people
Polish male sprinters
World Athletics Championships athletes for Poland
People from Siemianowice Śląskie
Universiade medalists in athletics (track and field)
Universiade bronze medalists for Poland
Competitors at the 2017 Summer Universiade
Medalists at the 2019 Summer Universiade
Olympic athletes of Poland
Athletes (track and field) at the 2020 Summer Olympics
Olympic gold medalists for Poland
Medalists at the 2020 Summer Olympics
Olympic gold medalists in athletics (track and field)
21st-century Polish people